The Spectacular Spider-Man is an American superhero animated television series based on the Marvel Comics character Spider-Man, created and developed  by Greg Weisman and Victor Cook. In terms of overall tone and style, the series is based principally on the Stan Lee, Steve Ditko and John Romita Sr. era of The Amazing Spider-Man comic books, with a similar balance of action, drama and comedy as well as a high school setting. However, it also tends to blend material from all eras of the comic's run up to that point in addition to other sources such as the Ultimate Spider-Man comics by Brian Michael Bendis and Mark Bagley, as well as Sam Raimi's Spider-Man film series.

The Spectacular Spider-Man was jointly produced by Adelaide Productions and Marvel Entertainment. It premiered on March 8, 2008, during the Kids' WB programming block of The CW. The series aired its second season on Marvel's sister network Disney XD in the United States and ended its run on November 18, 2009. The entire series was broadcast in Canada on Teletoon. Although a total of five seasons consisting of 65 episodes was initially intended in addition to various direct-to-video films connecting each season, the series was canceled before production could begin on the planned third season, due to legal problems between Disney (who had entered an agreement to acquire Marvel during the show's run) and Sony Pictures Television (the series' distributor and parent of Adelaide Productions), who had relinquished the rights to produce television content under 45 minutes using Spider-Man and associated characters ahead of their acquisition, while retaining all production and distribution rights to the series.

The series received widespread acclaim from both critics and fans, with praise being aimed at the exploration of surprisingly mature themes, the faithful portrayal of the titular protagonist (along with the supporting characters and villains), the vocal performances from the cast, the unique character designs and art style, and the use of clever writing while paying homage to classic stories from the comics. IGN named The Spectacular Spider-Man #30th in the Top 100 Best Animated TV Shows in January 2009. The series was also awarded Best Animated Series in both 2008 and 2009 with the series' version of the main character being named TV's Best Hero in 2008. Subsequently, it was placed second in the Top 25 Comic Book TV Shows in 2011 (behind Batman: The Animated Series). TV Guide listed the series as one of the sixty greatest animated series of all time. The series' iteration of Spider-Man will return in the 2023 film Spider-Man: Across the Spider-Verse.

Synopsis
Each season of the series takes place over a semester of Peter's high school years, with season one running from September to November and season two from December to March.

Producer Greg Weisman has stated that the series' theme is "The Education of Peter Parker." In keeping with this theme, each of the show's arcs is named after a course of study: season one's arcs are Biology 101, Economics 101, Chemistry 101, and Psychology 101; and season two's arcs are Engineering 101, Human Development 101, Criminology 101, and Drama 101.

Season 1
The first season opens with Peter Parker entering his junior year at Midtown Manhattan Magnet High School, having only been bitten by a genetically-enhanced spider and acquired his powers in recent months. Peter struggles to balance his responsibilities as the costumed hero Spider-Man with the problems of his personal life. In addition to fighting crime, he must navigate his romantic affections for Gwen Stacy and Mary Jane Watson; maintain his friendships with Harry Osborn and Eddie Brock; deal with being bullied by football star Flash Thompson at school; keep his internship position as a lab assistant to Dr. Curt Connors at Empire State University; and help to support his Aunt May after the death of his Uncle Ben by working as a freelance photographer at the Daily Bugle. The Bugle is owned by loudmouth publisher J. Jonah Jameson, who often uses Peter's pictures of his alter-ego to discredit and carry out a smear campaign against Spider-Man.

Spider-Man's fight against crime attracts the attention of Tombstone, the "Big Man of Crime" in New York City. With the help of corrupt businessman Norman Osborn, timid scientist Dr. Otto Octavius, and mob enforcer Hammerhead, Tombstone orchestrates the creation of various super-criminals to distract Spider-Man from interfering with his empire. Among the "supervillains" that Spider-Man is forced to contend with are the Vulture, Electro, the Lizard, Shocker, Sandman, Rhino, Doctor Octopus, Chameleon, and Black Cat. Tombstone's plans are complicated when the mysterious Green Goblin surfaces and attempts to take control of the city's criminal underworld. After the Green Goblin is seemingly vanquished, Spider-Man must overcome an alien symbiote slowly taking control of his body, which ultimately leads to Eddie Brock's transformation into Venom.

Season 2
The second season finds Peter Parker's life becoming significantly more complicated when he finds himself torn between Gwen Stacy and Liz Allan, both of whom have confessed their feelings for him; Mary Jane Watson endeavors to help Gwen win Peter's affections. While Harry Osborn returns to school after a leave of absence, his father Norman Osborn takes on the role of Peter's mentor, helping Peter to reacquire his internship position as Dr. Curt Connors' lab assistant.

Meanwhile, Spider-Man faces new villains such as Mysterio, Kraven the Hunter, the Tinkerer, Silver Sable, and Molten Man. Several of the web-slinger's old enemies also return, including Venom who attempts to expose Spider-Man's secret identity and remove his powers. An all-out gang war later erupts between Tombstone's established order, the Master Planner's supervillain forces, and the old guard of the Silvermane crime family. Once all of these major threats have been dealt with, Spider-Man must have a final confrontation with the Green Goblin, who masterminded the gang war to eliminate his opposition, take control of New York City, and destroy the wall-crawler once and for all.

The series concludes with loose ends due to the show's cancellation before a third season could be produced. Other new characters introduced, who were intended to have more prominent roles in future seasons, include Sha Shan Nguyen, Dr. Miles Warren, Calypso, Cletus Kasady, Morris Bench, and Roderick Kingsley. Mac Gargan is also briefly mentioned.

Episodes

Cast and characters

The vast timeline of the Spider-Man comics has been condensed and reconfigured to include classic and important characters within the same timeframe. Gwen Stacy, Harry Osborn and Mary Jane Watson are depicted not as direct equivalents to their counterparts, but rather as characters who will eventually evolve into their established roles from the comics. The series sports a wide supporting cast where every named character who is featured, in however minor a capacity, is based on a character who has appeared in either the main continuity of the comics, the Ultimate Spider-Man comics (such as Kenny Kong), or Sam Raimi's film series (such as Bernard Houseman). The series incorporates numerous villains from different eras of the Spider-Man mythology, almost all of whom are introduced as regular characters before they adopt their established villain identities in later episodes (such as Eddie Brock, who is introduced in the pilot but only becomes Venom at the end of season one).

Main cast
Josh Keaton – Peter Parker / Spider-Man
Lacey Chabert – Gwen Stacy
James Arnold Taylor – Harry Osborn, Fredrick Foswell / Patch
Daran Norris – J. Jonah Jameson, John Jameson
Vanessa Marshall – Mary Jane Watson
Joshua LeBar – Flash Thompson
Alanna Ubach – Liz Allan
Clancy Brown – George Stacy, Alex O'Hirn / Rhino, Ox (pilot)
Alan Rachins – Norman Osborn

Additional voices
Thom Adcox – Phineas Mason / Tinkerer
Ed Asner – Ben Parker
Dee Bradley Baker – Dr. Curt Connors / Lizard
Irene Bedard – Jean DeWolff
Jeff Bennett – Montana / Shocker, St. John Devereaux, Bernard Houseman
Xander Berkeley – Quentin Beck / Mysterio
Steve Blum – Green Goblin, Chameleon, Blackie Gaxton, Dillbert Trilby, Seymour O'Reilly
Angela Bryant – Calypso
Max Burkholder – Billy Connors
Robert Costanzo – Sullivan Edwards
Nikki Cox – Sable Manfredi / Silver Sable
Jim Cummings – Cat Burglar (season one), Crusher Hogan
Keith David – Big Man (pilot)
Grey DeLisle – Betty Brant, Sally Avril
John DiMaggio – Flint Marko / Sandman, Hammerhead
Benjamin Diskin – Eddie Brock / Venom
Charles Duckworth – Hobie Brown
Robert Englund – Adrian Toomes / Vulture
Bill Fagerbakke – Morris Bench
Miguel Ferrer – Silvio Manfredi / Silvermane
Crispin Freeman – Max Dillon / Electro
Elisa Gabrielli – Dr. Ashley Kafka
Brian George – Aaron Warren, Dr. Miles Warren
Dorian Harewood – Dr. Bromwell
Tricia Helfer – Felicia Hardy / Black Cat
Kelly Hu – Sha Shan Nguyen
Andrew Kishino – Kenny Kong, Ned Lee
Clyde Kusatsu – Ted Twaki
Phil LaMarr – Robbie Robertson, Rand Robertson, Fancy Dan / Ricochet
Stan Lee – Stan
Eric Lopez – Mark Allan / Molten Man
Jane Lynch – Joan Jameson
Peter MacNicol – Dr. Otto Octavius / Doctor Octopus / Master Planner
James Remar – Walter Hardy / Cat Burglar (season two)
Kevin Michael Richardson – L. Thompson Lincoln / Tombstone / Big Man, Principal Davis
Kath Soucie – Dr. Martha Connors, Anna Watson
Deborah Strang – May Parker
Cree Summer – Glory Grant
Danny Trejo – Ox
Courtney B. Vance – Roderick Kingsley
Eric Vesbit – Sergei Kravinoff / Kraven the Hunter
B.J. Ward – Mayor Waters
Greg Weisman – Donald Menken
Thomas F. Wilson – Stan Carter

Crew

Greg Weisman – Supervising Producer/Story Editor/Writer
Victor Cook – Supervising Producer (Season 2)/Supervising Director
Diane A. Crea – Producer
Eric Vesbit – Associate Producer
Wade Wisninski – Associate Producer
Dave Bullock – Director (four episodes)
Kevin Altieri – Director (four episodes)
John Diaz – Production Manager
Kevin Hopps – Writer
Matt Wayne – Writer
Andrew Robinson – Writer
Randy Jandt – Script Coordinator/Writer's Apprentice/Writer
Jennifer Coyle – Director (six episodes)
Sean "Cheeks" Galloway – Lead Character Designer/ Character Supervisor
Mike Inman – Background Painter/Visual Development
Jamie Thomason – Voice Casting Director and Dialogue Director
Meagan Healy – Production Art Supervisor
Brian G. Smith – Production Art Supervisor
Ben Maloney – Production Assistant
Sherrian Felix – Production Coordinator
Jennifer L. Anderson – Post Production Assistant
Sean Herbert – Animation Clerk

Production
A new Spider-Man animated series was announced in August 2006 along with Sony Pictures TV's new direct-to-DVD division, Culver Entertainment, that would produce it with 13 half hour episodes. The series was planned for a 2007 release on DVD while international distributing to TV channels including Sony's. The DVD format was to be four discs with three episodes each. Greg Weisman and Victor Cook developed the show.

The Spectacular Spider-Man was announced by Kids' WB Senior Vice President and General Manager Betsy McGowen on June 18, 2007 as being picked up and slated for an early 2008 premiere by the Kids' WB! on The CW. Weisman and Cook were assigned to the series at the time as supervising producer and producer/supervising director, respectively. The art style of the series is more simplified than in previous incarnations but retain their iconic elements. This choice was made to ensure Spider-Man would move as he should and replicate the fluidity from Sam Raimi's movie incarnation.

The series was produced by its television animation studio, Adelaide Productions (due to Sony's complete control over the Spider-Man entertainment license at the time) with Hanho Heung-Up Co., Ltd., Dong Woo Animation and MOI Animation, Inc. contributed some of the animation for this series. The title sequence for the show was directed by Victor Cook with the theme song written and performed by The Tender Box.

Weisman has explained that in adapting the comics for the show, the producers "tried to follow what [they] came to call "The Five Cs": Contemporary, Cohesive, Coherent, Classic and iConic." "The advantage of hindsight" allowed the show to be "more coherent and cohesive than the original" comic continuity, which contains "considerable duplication, a false start here and there, [and] conflicting interpretations." Weisman studied all of the characters to find their "core essence," and the show often combined characters and storylines when necessary for the sake of coherence. For example, Flash Thompson was found to be "a bully, who deep down is actually an honorable guy," while Shocker was found to be an "iconic costume" with no character, so he was combined with Montana.

The Spectacular Spider-Man debuted on March 8, 2008 with back-to-back episodes, "Survival of the Fittest" and "Interactions", under the banner "Spectacular Saturday". The series debuted under a cloud as The CW had just indicated that the network would end its kid's block for a brokered outsourced block. While Culver had already started producing the second season.

Cancellation and Future

Production issues 
Greg Weisman was hoping for the series to reach 5 seasons consisting of 65 episodes in total. Only 2 seasons and 26 episodes of The Spectacular Spider-Man were produced.

The series stopped production with a renewal dependent upon the ratings for season 2 on the U.S. Disney XD channel and the sales of the DVDs. On September 1, 2009, it was announced that the television rights for Spider-Man were returned to Marvel by Sony. At the time, President of Marvel Animation Eric Rollman further stated that "no decisions have been made either way" regarding the fate of the series. On April 13, 2010, Newsarama reported that the series' cancellation occurred just after The Walt Disney Company acquired Marvel Entertainment in December 2009.

On that same day, Marvel announced that a new series loosely based on the Ultimate Spider-Man comic book storyline would air on Disney XD in the fall of 2011, which actually aired on April 1, 2012. Weisman told IGN:
"I've heard nothing directly from Marvel, but I think the Ultimate Spider-Man announcement makes it fairly clear that The Spectacular Spider-Man is over." Marvel Animation and Sony also commented on this to Marvel Animation Age, confirming that the series had ceased production.

Weisman would later write that in summer 2009, in exchange for concessions on the movie rights, Sony had relinquished to Marvel its license to produce television works that used Spider-Man and associated characters, but had retained ownership of The Spectacular Spider-Man series and all of the production elements created specifically for it, such as character designs and storylines. Weisman claimed that Sony's decision to return the license to Marvel had occurred just prior to that year's San Diego Comic-Con, and that he and supervising director Victor Cook were only made aware of this development just as The Walt Disney Company announced their intentions to buy Marvel Entertainment in its entirety, thereby receiving the license to produce Spider-Man content for television.  Therefore, neither Sony nor Marvel could continue production of the series, as each lacked some of the essential rights to do so. Disney would eventually finalize their acquisition of Marvel and all related assets in December 2009, just after the second season concluded airing on Disney XD, Marvel's new sister network.

Future plot details 
Due to the show's cancellation, many storylines were abandoned. In season 3, Curt would have moved to Florida and begun working on a cure for Electro and a planned DVD Spring Break movie would have also been set in Florida between season 2 and 3, with movies between seasons 3 and 4, and between seasons 4 and 5 to follow. Scorpion, Hydro-Man, and Hobgoblin were confirmed to be major villains for season 3, in addition to Carnage, Mister Negative and Morbius, the Living Vampire. Emily Osborn was also planned to appear as a major supporting character in the third season after making non-speaking cameo appearances throughout season 2, with Marina Sirtis intended to be cast in the role, after previously collaborating with Greg Weisman on the series Gargoyles (1994–97). Weisman also indicated that the creative team had long-term plans regarding the introduction of Miles Warren, a character who eventually becomes the Jackal in the comics, as well as Stan Carter and Jean DeWolff, who are both pivotal to the origin of the former becoming the vigilante Sin-Eater. There were also plans to eventually seed more elements of the Spider-Man mythos from the comics in the show beyond season 2, including the introduction of the Spider-Mobile and Spider-tracers, as well as a future episode exploring how Peter developed his web-shooters. Season 3 was also meant to introduce a new storyline involving Eddie Brock being placed in the Ravencroft Institute, as well as reveal that the gene cleanser Peter used on the Venom symbiote in season 2 didn't actually affect it. Weisman also expressed his wish to use other characters from the wider Marvel Universe that weren't solely associated with Spider-Man as the series had done up to that point, such as Beast, Cyclops, Professor X, Captain America, the Hulk, and Johnny Storm. Weisman elaborated by stating he hoped the introduction of said characters into the continuity of The Spectacular Spider-Man would've eventually resulted in spin-off shows focusing on the superhero teams these characters are associated with, the X-Men, Avengers and Fantastic Four, respectively. Furthermore, plans for a musical-themed episode and an episode adapting issue #8 of The Amazing Spider-Man, involving an after-school boxing match between Peter and Flash Thompson, were also abandoned. 
After the initial 65 episode series plan and movies, which would've covered the characters' entire duration in high school, Weisman had wished to produce DVD sequels covering Peter's college years and his eventual marriage to Mary Jane as depicted in comics until 2007.

In early 2010, shortly after the series concluded airing in the U.S., Josh Keaton was tapped to reprise the role of Peter Parker / Spider-Man in the Disney-produced animated series, The Avengers: Earth's Mightiest Heroes (2010–2012), appearing in the season 2 episodes "Along Came a Spider", "Yellowjacket", "New Avengers" and the series finale, "Avengers Assemble". Keaton would've appeared in the series alongside two of his co-stars from The Spectacular Spider-Man: Grey DeLisle, reprising her voice work as Betty Brant, and Daran Norris, who voiced J. Jonah Jameson on the series and appeared as a policeman in Earth's Mightiest Heroes. However, upon the airing of his first planned episode in Australia ahead of its debut in the U.S., it was discovered and reported by Jesse Betteridge of the Facebook page "Keep Spectacular Spider-Man Alive", that Keaton's voice had appeared to have been replaced by Drake Bell, who succeeded him as the voice of Spider-Man in the following series, Ultimate Spider-Man. Keaton would later confirm his replacement, additionally surmising that Marvel had dubbed Bell's vocals over Keaton's original performance, despite the fact he had recorded all of his voice work for Spider-Man's respective appearances on the series. Series creator Christopher Yost would later address Keaton's involvement, revealing that Spider-Man in Earth's Mightiest Heroes was intended to share continuity with the iteration featured in The Spectacular Spider-Man, and that his debut episode was written to emulate the tone of the prior series. Despite the implicit connections, Greg Weisman himself would dismiss the proposition, affirming that The Spectacular Spider-Man was set in its own distinct universe, that would've been expanded upon to feature its own interpretation of numerous non-Spider-Man Marvel characters had the series continued.

#SaveSpectacularSpiderMan movement 
Despite the legal troubles between Sony and Marvel, fans have continued to voice their support for the series more than a decade after its cancellation, in the hopes for more episodes to be produced someday. An online petition on Change.org requesting for a possible third season has managed to gather more than 22,000 signatures. On January 9, 2021 at 4:00pm, the hashtags #SaveSpectacularSpiderMan and #SpectacularSpiderMan were trending on Twitter (with the former temporarily trending between #13 and #9 within the site), after users created a "tweet storm" requesting for the series to return and finish being produced. Josh Keaton, who voices Peter Parker in the show, also responded to the trending hashtags while wearing a Spider-Man mask and staying in-character, saying, "I just wanted to shout out some support to everyone tweeting today with #SaveSpectacularSpiderMan. This much support after over a decade? Aw, you guys really know how to make a Webhead feel special!" While promoting his DC Comics animated film Catwoman: Hunted (2022), Greg Weisman also responded to the ongoing fan campaign calling for The Spectacular Spider-Man's revival, ultimately expressing doubt as to the likelihood of the series returning, but concluding that he would "love to do it again".

On December 20, 2022, the iteration of Peter Parker from The Spectacular Spider-Man was revealed to be making an appearance in the upcoming film Spider-Man: Across the Spider-Verse (2023) through his inclusion on promotional material, with producer and writer Christopher Miller confirming his presence in the film to a fan on Twitter. In the film, Parker will be an alternate Spider-Man featured as a member of the Spider-Forces led by Miguel O' Hara / Spider-Man 2099 (Oscar Isaac). His inclusion in the film prompted positive reactions from fans of the series, as well as responses from co-showrunner Victor Cook, and lead artist Sean "Cheeks" Galloway, who were similarly appreciative of their show's acknowledgement.

Home media
The series was initially developed so that each three to four episode arc could be edited together into a feature-length home video release. The first DVD for the show, entitled "Attack of the Lizard", followed this plan with the first three episodes edited together to form a stand-alone story with additional footage. The region 1 version was released on September 9, 2008.

This release strategy changed with the region 1 release of the second and third DVDs of the series on March 17, 2009. Originally promoted with the titles "Rise of the Supervillains" and "The Goblin Strikes" respectively, these releases were revised to feature the televised versions of the episodes and were ultimately released as numbered volumes. Since then, retailer stores have stopped releasing "Attack of the Lizard", and have replaced it with volume 1. Volume 4 was released in region 1 on April 28, 2009, in the same format.

"The Spectacular Spider-Man: The Complete First Season" DVD was released in region 1 on July 28, 2009.

DVD volume 5 was released in region 1 on November 17, 2009. DVD volumes 6 and 7 were released on February 16, 2010. DVD volume 8 was released on April 27, 2010.

The first 4 volumes that comprise season 1 for region 2 have been released with volumes 3 and 4 having been released on August 23, 2010.

To coincide with the theatrical release of The Amazing Spider-Man 2, Sony Pictures Home Entertainment released The Spectacular Spider-Man: The Complete Series on Blu-ray on April 25, 2014.

On July 9th, 2022, the entire series was made available to stream on Netflix but was later removed on December 16th, 2022. The series was additionally added to Disney+ on October 19, 2022.

Reception
The Spectacular Spider-Man was released to widespread acclaim, with praise being aimed at the exploration of surprisingly mature themes, the faithfulness to the source material, the vocal performances from the cast, the unique character designs and art style, the animation, and the use of clever writing while paying homage to classic stories from the comics. Before the series premiere, Matt Sernaker of ComicsOnline interviewed some of the Spectacular Spider-Man development team at WonderCon 2008 after a preview screening and stated: "This new Spider-Man series truly is SPECTACULAR... surpasses all of the previous incarnations with ease. If you are a Spidey fan you will not want to miss this."

Early in the series' run, Alan Kistler of ComicMix called the series "one of the best superhero adaptations I've ever seen (and trust me, I've watched more than anyone will probably consider reasonable). It's fun, it's smart, it's mature, it's witty and every episode leaves me wanting more."

In an article entitled "8 Reasons to Watch Spectacular Spider-Man", Reggie White, Jr. from Spiderfan wrote: "If you aren't watching The Spectacular Spider-Man on CW Kids' WB, you are missing out on what is quickly becoming one of the greatest Spidey cartoons of all-time."

Stu from Marvel Animation Age writes in his review of the series: "At time of writing, The Spectacular Spider-Man stands as Marvel's finest animated effort and surpasses most of DC's finest efforts – the only shows in Spectacular'''s league really, is Batman: The Animated Series itself. With more episodes, it may just surpass it."

IGN stated that Greg Weisman "has only cemented his reputation for quality television animation with his work on Spider-Man." IGN also named The Spectacular Spider-Man #30th in the Top 100 Best Animated TV Shows in January 2009. The series was also awarded Best Animated Series in both 2008 and 2009 with the series' version of the main character being named TV's Best Hero in 2008. Subsequently, it was placed second in the Top 25 Comic Book TV Shows in 2011 (behind Batman: The Animated Series).

Outside of comic resources, Variety highlighted that "although seemingly conceived largely to push a new line of Hasbro toys... the soon-to-fadeout Kids' WB (on the CW!) delivers a credible new version of 'Spider-Man,' emphasizing his relatable headaches as a 16-year-old superhero."

TV Guide listed the series as one of the sixty greatest animated series of all time. In its 2022 rankings, aggregation website TreasureTV ranked The Spectacular Spider-Man as the 725th best TV series of all time.

Syndication
On June 14, 2013, Saban Brands announced that they had acquired the broadcast rights to air the series on Vortexx on The CW for the Fall 2013–14 season, marking its return to The CW since the conclusion of the first season aired on June 14, 2008.

The series officially started airing on Vortexx on August 17, 2013 and it ended on September 27, 2014.

Toys and merchandise
Hasbro released a toy line of action figures in March 2008.

McDonald's Happy Meals celebrated their 30th Anniversary with The Spectacular Spider-Man toys in February 2009.India Infoline News Service:  February 09, 2009

In February 2010, Burger King included The Spectacular Spider-Man toys in its Kids' Meals toys range.

See also

 Spider-Man: The Animated Series''

Notes

References

External links

The Spectacular Spider-Man @ Sony Pictures Kids 
The Spectacular Spider-Man @ Marvel Animation Age
The Spectacular Spider-Man @ Animated Superheroes
Sean Galloway's blog
Comic Historian Alan Kistler interviews Greg Weisman about Spectacular Spider-Man

 
2000s American animated television series
2000s American high school television series
2008 American television series debuts
2009 American television series endings
American children's animated action television series
American children's animated adventure television series
American children's animated science fantasy television series
American children's animated superhero television series
Animated Spider-Man television series
Animated television series based on Marvel Comics
CW4Kids original programming
Kids' WB original shows
Teen animated television series
Teen superhero television series
Television shows based on Marvel Comics
Television series by Sony Pictures Television
Television shows set in New York City
The CW original programming
Television series by Adelaide Productions
Disney XD original programming